Molla Mahalleh (also Romanized as Mollā Maḩalleh; also known as Mollā Maḩalleh-ye 59, and Mollā Maḩalleh-ye Panjāh-o-noh) is a village in Khaleh Sara Rural District, Asalem District, Talesh County, Gilan Province, Iran. At the 2006 census, its population was 276, in 68 families.

References 

Populated places in Talesh County